In Euclidean geometry, Ptolemy's theorem is a relation between the four sides and two diagonals of a cyclic quadrilateral (a quadrilateral whose vertices lie on a common circle). The theorem is named after the Greek astronomer and mathematician Ptolemy (Claudius Ptolemaeus). Ptolemy used the theorem as an aid to creating his table of chords, a trigonometric table that he applied to astronomy.

If the vertices of the cyclic quadrilateral are A, B, C, and D in order, then the theorem states that:

 

where the vertical lines denote the lengths of the line segments between the named vertices. This relation may be verbally expressed as follows:

If a quadrilateral is inscribable in a circle then the product of the lengths of its diagonals is equal to the sum of the products of the lengths of the pairs of opposite sides.

Moreover, the converse of Ptolemy's theorem is also true:

In a quadrilateral, if the sum of the products of the lengths of its two pairs of opposite sides is equal to the product of the lengths of its diagonals, then the quadrilateral can be inscribed in a circle i.e. it is a cyclic quadrilateral.

Corollaries on Inscribed Polygons

Equilateral triangle

Ptolemy's Theorem yields as a corollary a pretty theorem regarding an equilateral triangle inscribed in a circle.

Given An equilateral triangle inscribed on a circle and a point on the circle.

The distance from the point to the most distant vertex of the triangle is the sum of the distances from the point to the two nearer vertices.

Proof: Follows immediately from Ptolemy's theorem:

Square

Any square can be inscribed in a circle whose center is the center of the square. If the common length of its four sides is equal to  then the length of the diagonal is equal to  according to the Pythagorean theorem, and Ptolemy's relation obviously holds.

Rectangle

More generally, if the quadrilateral is a rectangle with sides a and b and diagonal d then Ptolemy's theorem reduces to the Pythagorean theorem. In this case the center of the circle coincides with the point of intersection of the diagonals. The product of the diagonals is then d2, the right hand side of Ptolemy's relation is the sum a2 + b2.

Copernicus – who used Ptolemy's theorem extensively in his trigonometrical work – refers to this result as a 'Porism' or self-evident corollary:

Furthermore it is clear (manifestum est) that when the chord subtending an arc has been given, that chord too can be found which subtends the rest of the semicircle.

Pentagon

A more interesting example is the relation between the length a of the side and the (common) length b of the 5 chords in a regular pentagon. By completing the square, the relation yields the golden ratio:

Side of decagon

If now diameter AF is drawn bisecting DC so that DF and CF are sides c of an inscribed decagon, Ptolemy's Theorem can again be applied – this time to cyclic quadrilateral ADFC with diameter d as one of its diagonals:

 where  is the golden ratio.

whence the side of the inscribed decagon is obtained in terms of the circle diameter. Pythagoras's theorem applied to right triangle AFD then yields "b" in terms of the diameter and "a" the side of the pentagon  is thereafter calculated as

As Copernicus (following Ptolemy) wrote,

"The diameter of a circle being given, the sides of the triangle, tetragon, pentagon, hexagon and decagon, which the same circle circumscribes, are also given."

Proofs

Visual proof 

The animation here shows a visual demonstration of Ptolemy's theorem, based on Derrick & Herstein (2012).

Proof by similarity of triangles 

Let ABCD be a cyclic quadrilateral.
On the chord BC, the inscribed angles ∠BAC = ∠BDC, and on AB, ∠ADB = ∠ACB.
Construct K on AC such that ∠ABK = ∠CBD; since ∠ABK + ∠CBK = ∠ABC = ∠CBD + ∠ABD, ∠CBK = ∠ABD.

Now, by common angles △ABK is similar to △DBC, and likewise △ABD is similar to △KBC.
Thus AK/AB = CD/BD, and CK/BC = DA/BD;
equivalently, AK⋅BD = AB⋅CD, and CK⋅BD = BC⋅DA.
By adding two equalities we have AK⋅BD + CK⋅BD = AB⋅CD + BC⋅DA, and factorizing this gives (AK+CK)·BD = AB⋅CD + BC⋅DA.
But AK+CK = AC, so AC⋅BD = AB⋅CD + BC⋅DA, Q.E.D.

The proof as written is only valid for simple cyclic quadrilaterals. If the quadrilateral is self-crossing then K will be located outside the line segment AC. But in this case, AK−CK = ±AC, giving the expected result.

Proof by trigonometric identities 

from which the factor  has disappeared by dividing both sides of the equation by it.

Q.E.D.

Here is another, perhaps more transparent, proof using rudimentary trigonometry.
Define a new quadrilateral  inscribed in the same circle, where  are the same
.  
Then,  has the same edges lengths, and consequently the same inscribed angles subtended by 
Also,  and  have the same area. Then, 

 
Q.E.D.

Proof by inversion 

Choose an auxiliary circle  of radius  centered at D with respect to which the circumcircle of ABCD is inverted into a line (see figure).
Then

Then  and  can be expressed as 
,  and  respectively.

Q.E.D.

Note that if the quadrilateral is not cyclic then A', B' and C' form a triangle and hence A'B'+B'C' > A'C', giving us a very simple proof of Ptolemy's Inequality which is presented below.

Proof using complex numbers 
Define the cross-ratio
.
Then 

with equality if and only if .  This proves Ptolemy's inequality generally, as it remains only to show that  lie consecutively arranged
on a circle (possibly of infinite radius, i.e. a line) in  if and only if .

From the polar form of a complex number , it follows

Q.E.D.

;

is then directly established from the simple algebraic identity

Corollaries

Similarly the diagonals are equal to the sine of the sum of whichever pair of angles they subtend. We may then write Ptolemy's Theorem in the following trigonometric form:

Applying certain conditions to the subtended angles  and  it is possible to derive a number of important corollaries using the above as our starting point. In what follows it is important to bear in mind that the sum of angles .

Corollary 1. Pythagoras's theorem
Then 
(since opposite angles of a cyclic quadrilateral are supplementary). Then:

Corollary 2. The law of cosines

Let . The rectangle of corollary 1 is now a symmetrical trapezium with equal diagonals and a pair of equal sides. The parallel sides differ in length by  units where:

It will be easier in this case to revert to the standard statement of Ptolemy's theorem:

The cosine rule for triangle ABC.

Corollary 3. Compound angle sine (+)
Let

 

Then

Therefore,

 

Formula for compound angle sine (+).

Corollary 4. Compound angle sine (−) 
Let . Then . Hence,

 

 

Formula for compound angle sine (−).

This derivation corresponds to the Third Theorem
as chronicled by Copernicus following Ptolemy in Almagest. In particular if the sides of a pentagon (subtending 36° at the circumference) and of a hexagon (subtending 30° at the circumference) are given, a chord subtending 6° may be calculated. This was a critical step in the ancient method of calculating tables of chords.

Corollary 5. Compound angle cosine (+)
This corollary is the core of the Fifth Theorem as chronicled by Copernicus following Ptolemy in Almagest.

Let . Then . Hence

 

 

Formula for compound angle cosine (+)

Despite lacking the dexterity of our modern trigonometric notation, it should be clear from the above corollaries that in Ptolemy's theorem (or more simply the Second Theorem) the ancient world had at its disposal an extremely flexible and powerful trigonometric tool which enabled the cognoscenti of those times to draw up accurate tables of chords (corresponding to tables of sines) and to use these in their attempts to understand and map the cosmos as they saw it. Since tables of chords were drawn up by Hipparchus three centuries before Ptolemy, we must assume he knew of the 'Second Theorem' and its derivatives. Following the trail of ancient astronomers, history records the star catalogue of Timocharis of Alexandria. If, as seems likely, the compilation of such catalogues required an understanding of the 'Second Theorem' then the true origins of the latter disappear thereafter into the mists of antiquity but it cannot be unreasonable to presume that the astronomers, architects and construction engineers of ancient Egypt may have had some knowledge of it.

Ptolemy's inequality

The equation in Ptolemy's theorem is never true with non-cyclic quadrilaterals. Ptolemy's inequality is an extension of this fact, and it is a more general form of Ptolemy's theorem. It states that, given a quadrilateral ABCD, then

 

where equality holds if and only if the quadrilateral is cyclic. This special case is equivalent to Ptolemy's theorem.

Related theorem about the ratio of the diagonals 
Ptolemy's theorem gives the product of the diagonals (of a cyclic quadrilateral) knowing the sides, the following theorem yields the same for the ratio of the diagonals.
 

Proof: It is known that the area of a triangle  inscribed in a circle of diameter  is: 

Writing the area of the quadrilateral as sum of two triangles sharing the same circumscribing circle, we obtain two relations for each decomposition.

 

 

Equating, we obtain the announced formula.

Consequence: Knowing both the product and the ratio of the diagonals, we deduce their immediate expressions:

See also 

 Casey's theorem
 Greek mathematics

Notes

References
 Coxeter, H. S. M. and S. L. Greitzer (1967) "Ptolemy's Theorem and its Extensions." §2.6 in Geometry Revisited, Mathematical Association of America pp. 42–43.
 Copernicus (1543) De Revolutionibus Orbium Coelestium, English translation found in On the Shoulders of Giants (2002) edited by Stephen Hawking, Penguin Books 
 Amarasinghe, G. W. I. S. (2013) A Concise Elementary Proof for the Ptolemy's Theorem, Global Journal of Advanced Research on Classical and Modern Geometries (GJARCMG) 2(1): 20–25 (pdf).

External links
 Proof of Ptolemy's Theorem for Cyclic Quadrilateral
 MathPages – On Ptolemy's Theorem
 
 Ptolemy's Theorem at cut-the-knot
 Compound angle proof at cut-the-knot
Ptolemy's Theorem  on PlanetMath
Ptolemy Inequality on MathWorld
De Revolutionibus Orbium Coelestium at Harvard.
Deep Secrets: The Great Pyramid, the Golden Ratio and the Royal Cubit
Ptolemy's Theorem by Jay Warendorff, The Wolfram Demonstrations Project.
Book XIII of Euclid's Elements

Theorems about quadrilaterals and circles
Theorem
Articles containing proofs
Euclidean plane geometry